Buddy Rice (born January 31, 1976) is an American former race car driver. He is best known for winning the 2004 Indianapolis 500 while driving for Rahal Letterman Racing, and the 2009 24 Hours of Daytona for Brumos Racing.

Career

Early years

Born in Phoenix, Arizona, Buddy Rice is the son of a former drag racer. Rice's grandfather was from Indianapolis and passed on his interest in racing to Rice's father. Rice saw his first race when he was six years old. He started racing in go-karts when he was 11. Rice played baseball in high school in Phoenix, Arizona, and attracted the attention of college and professional scouts. However, both Rice and his father decided he would pursue a career in racing instead.

Rice's professional career began in 1996, when he drove in one U.S. F2000 event; he finished eighth after starting second. He also drove in the Dodge Shelby Pro Series, winning from the pole at Las Vegas, Nevada.

In 1997, Rice drove in F2000 for Lynx Racing/DSTP Motorsports, finishing fourth in points and winning at Phoenix. He also won the 1997 Valvoline Team USA Scholarship, where he represented the United States in Europe’s Nations Cup.

In 1998, he won from the pole at Nazareth. He finished seventh in Toyota Atlantic points, and won the Gilles Villeneuve Memorial Award. He finished fifth in the Toyota Atlantic championship in 1999, driving for Lynx Racing.

He won the 2000 Toyota Atlantic Series championship, which gained the attention of Red Bull Cheever Racing. In 2001, he tested with Red Bull Cheever Racing in November at California.

IRL IndyCar Series
In August 2002, Rice had his first race in the IRL for Red Bull Cheever Racing at Michigan International Speedway. Hired initially to replace crash-prone Tomas Scheckter, team owner Eddie Cheever discovered that Scheckter's contract was more iron-clad than first thought. Team Cheever then ran three entries (joined by their team owner), and the best crew and parts were given to Rice. Rice lost the race by inches to Scheckter, but made a mark in the series. He competed in the final five races of the IRL IndyCar Series season with Red Bull Cheever Racing, scoring four top-10 finishes and two top-five finishes in five starts.

In 2003, Rice competed in 13 of 16 races for Red Bull Cheever Racing but was replaced by the more experienced Alex Barron.

In November 2003, he dabbled with a one-off drive in a NASCAR Craftsman Truck Series race at the Homestead circuit before being called by Bobby Rahal to drive the No. 15 Argent Mortgage Honda when Kenny Bräck was injured in a late-race crash at Texas Motor Speedway in 2003.

In 2004, Rice started on pole and won a rain-shortened Indianapolis 500, his first Indycar race victory. He finished 3rd in the IRL championship that year, earning five poles, three wins and leading 342 laps. After his Indy 500 win, his sponsors told him that they would buy him any car he wanted, he chose a 1949 Mercury Eight.

For 2005 he and Vítor Meira were joined by Danica Patrick. However, Rice was injured in a crash at Indianapolis during practice, and was not cleared to race. In an ironic twist, Bräck then substituted for Rice.

The 2006 season began tragically for Rice at the season-opening race at Homestead-Miami Speedway when teammate Paul Dana of Rahal Letterman Racing team was killed in the final practice session. Rice and his other teammate Danica Patrick immediately withdrew from the race. Rice started his 2006 season in the following race at St. Petersburg, Florida. His Indianapolis 500 race ended early in a crash with Hélio Castroneves. After the IRL season ended, he raced in the Champ Car World Series race at Autodromo Hermanos Rodriguez for Forsythe Racing and finished 10th.

For 2007, Rice joined Sarah Fisher at Dreyer & Reinbold Racing. He captured 3 top-five finishes in the first half of the season and finished 9th in points, his best result since 2004. He was retained by the team for the 2008 IndyCar season, the high point of which came with a 4th-place finish at Watkins Glen. He ultimately finished 16th in points.

He did not participate in the 2009 IndyCar Series season after being released from Dreyer & Reinbold Racing at the end of the 2008 season. Further, his long-standing partnership with Red Bull also expired and was not renewed.

He raced for Panther Racing in the 2011 Indianapolis 500 as a teammate to J. R. Hildebrand driving the No. 44 Honda Dallara.

A1 Grand Prix
Starting the 2007-08 season, Rice signed to drive for A1 Team USA in the A1 Grand Prix international racing series. He drove in the first two rounds of the season with a best finish of 13th in the Zandvoort feature race before ceding the seat to Jonathan Summerton for the remainder of the season.

Grand-Am Rolex Sports Car Series

Rice competed in a few Grand-Am Rolex Sports Car Series in the early 2000s. In his debut in 2000, he finished second at Watkins Glen on a TRP Lola Nissan. In 2002 he resulted second at the 6 Hours of Watkins Glen and fourth in Homestead and Phoenix, driving a Miracle Riley & Scott Ford.

The driver competed at the 24 Hours of Daytona from 2005 to 2008, with a best result of 9th in 2006. He also raced at Utah from 2006 to 2008, collecting a 7th again in 2006.

In 2009, Rice won the 24 Hours of Daytona on a Brumos Racing Riley Porsche. He spent the second half of the season as teammate of Antonio García in a Spirit of Daytona Coyote Porsche, where he finished 4th at Barber in his only top 10.

Rice raced full-time for Spirit of Daytona in the 2010 Rolex Sports Car Series, joining again García. He helped Spirit of Daytona get the first podium finish for the team at the Six Hours of the Glen in 2010, collecting a third place. He also resulted 5th in three races and ended the season in 11th place.

His last Grand-Am race was the 2011 24 Hours of Daytona, where he finished 9th in an Action Express Racing Riley Porsche.

Personal
In his free time, Rice collects and restores classic cars. He has a child, Mina, who was born on April 9, 2008.

Motorsports career results

American open–wheel racing results
(key) (Races in bold indicate pole position) (Races in italics indicate fastest lap)

USF2000 National Championship

Atlantic Championship

IRL IndyCar Series

 1 Rahal-Letterman Racing withdrew both Rice and teammate Danica Patrick from competition when fellow teammate Paul Dana was killed in a race-morning practice session accident.
 2 Races run on same day. 3 Non-points-paying, exhibition race.Indianapolis 500

Champ Car World Series

Complete A1 Grand Prix results
(key) (Races in bold indicate pole position) (Races in italics'' indicate fastest lap)

International Race of Champions
(key) (Bold – Pole position. * – Most laps led.)

Camping World Truck Series

References

External links

 Official Site
 
 IndyCar Driver Page
 Buddy Rice on the Honda site

1976 births
24 Hours of Daytona drivers
A1 Team USA drivers
Atlantic Championship drivers
Champ Car drivers
EFDA Nations Cup drivers
Rolex Sports Car Series drivers
Indianapolis 500 drivers
Indianapolis 500 polesitters
Indianapolis 500 winners
IndyCar Series drivers
International Race of Champions drivers
Living people
Racing drivers from Phoenix, Arizona
Global RallyCross Championship drivers
WeatherTech SportsCar Championship drivers
U.S. F2000 National Championship drivers
A1 Grand Prix drivers
Cheever Racing drivers
Rahal Letterman Lanigan Racing drivers
Dreyer & Reinbold Racing drivers
Panther Racing drivers
Forsythe Racing drivers
Action Express Racing drivers